The Leine (Old Saxon Lagina) is a river in Thuringia and Lower Saxony, Germany.

The river's source is located close to the town of Leinefelde in Thuringia. About  downriver, the river enters Lower Saxony and runs northwards.

Important towns along its course, from upstream to downstream, are Göttingen, Einbeck, Freden, Alfeld, and Gronau, before the river enters Hanover, the largest city on its banks. Its northern (lower) reaches are only navigable today by the smallest commercial carriers, though in the past, it served as an important pre-railway barge transport artery as far upriver as Göttingen.

The river is somewhat polluted by industry, so the water is not used for drinking, but the pollution has never been severe enough to prevent fish from living in it. Like many western rivers since the 1960s, it has enjoyed increasingly cleaner waters since the implementation of environmental controls. Sport fishing is enjoyed from small boats and along the banks, although yields are normally low.

At least one point of the river (Göttingen) is partially diverted into a canal that runs more or less parallel to the river.

Serial killer Fritz Haarmann disposed of most of his victims' remains in the Leine river.

In fiction 

In his 1986 bestseller Red Storm Rising, author Tom Clancy uses the Leine as a major obstacle to the Soviet Union's Red Army drive to the Rhine and the North Sea ports of the Netherlands and Belgium through West Germany.  In reality, the river is a rather minor one, and, for most of its length, is quite narrow with a small flow volume.  As such, it would not provide a significant barrier to an advancing army.

See also
List of rivers of Thuringia
List of rivers of Lower Saxony

References

Further reading 
 Uwe Schmida: Die Leine - Eine fotografische Reise. 
 Gerd Lüttig: Neue Ergebnisse quartärgeologischer Forschung im Raume Alfeld-Hameln-Elze. In: Geologisches Jahrbuch vol. 77, page 337–390. Hannover, June 1960.

External links 
 
 Bundesamt für Naturschutz: Landschaftssteckbrief "Leine-Ilme-Senke"
 Bundesamt für Naturschutz: Landschaftssteckbrief "Leine-Niederung"

 
Rivers of Thuringia
Rivers of Lower Saxony
Federal waterways in Germany
Rivers of Germany